Philanthus politus is a white-striped species of bee-hunting wasp (or "beewolf").

References

Crabronidae
Hymenoptera of North America
Insects described in 1824